Calindoea argentalis is a moth of the family Thyrididae first described by Francis Walker in 1865. It is found in India, Sri Lanka, Java and Borneo.

Host plant is Syzygium jambos.

References

Moths of Asia
Moths described in 1913
Thyrididae